Mohd Suffian bin Ab Rahman Kungi Raman (23 February 1978 – 17 August 2019) was  a Malaysian footballer who last played as a goalkeeper for Terengganu.

Suffian only earned one international cap for Malaysia in the match against Cambodia after substituting for Azizon Abdul Kadir. He also was part of the Malaysian 2007 AFC Asian Cup squad but did not play any matches in the tournament.

Career statistics

Club

Death
Suffian died on 17 August 2019 after being hospitalized for two weeks due to a heart attack.

References

External links
  Biodata at Selangorfc.com 
 
 

1978 births
2019 deaths
Malaysian footballers
Malaysia international footballers
People from Malacca
2007 AFC Asian Cup players
Negeri Sembilan FA players
Kuala Muda Naza F.C. players
Melaka TM FC players
Selangor FA players
Sarawak FA players
Sri Pahang FC players
Felda United F.C. players
Sime Darby F.C. players
Malaysia Super League players
Association football goalkeepers
Malaysian people of Malay descent